Coy Wayne "Elvis" Wesbrook (February 1, 1958 – March 9, 2016) was an American mass murderer, convicted for the killing of five people in Channelview, Texas on November 13, 1997. Wesbrook fatally shot his ex-wife, Gloria Jean Coons, her female roommate, and three men during a party at Coons' home in an apparent fit of jealous rage.

Wesbrook was sentenced to death in 1998, and was executed by lethal injection in 2016.

Marriage and divorce 
On July 5, 1995, Wesbrook and Gloria Jean Coons were married. However, they had already lived together years before their marriage. In November 1997, they divorced, but Wesbrook wanted forgiveness. He attempted to reconcile with Coons by attending the party. At the time of his crime, he had one daughter.

Murders 
According to Wesbrook, on November 12th, he went to visit his ex-wife, Coons, at her home in Channelview, Texas, in the Greater Houston area. He was invited to a party at Coons' apartment along with other friends, Diana Ruth Money, and three other males. Wesbrook had gone there with hopes of rebuilding the relationship with Coons, but went into a rage when the party's attendees began to mock him because Coons had cheated on him in the bedroom. At some point in the evening, Wesbrook noticed that his ex-wife and two of the men had slipped away, and when he went into the bedroom, he found Coons having sex with both of the men. While they were mocking him Cruz stole his keys and hid them in his pants, preventing him from leaving. He was able to get his keys back and he left. A very short time later he returned in his truck and pulled out his .30-06 hunting rifle and returned to the residence. After bringing the gun into the room, the attendees continued to torment him. Money threw a can of beer at Wesbrook, which discharged the rifle, killing her. After he fired at her, Cruz and Rogers ran toward him and he fired at them too. He then entered the room where Hazlip and Coons were having sex, and fatally shot them both.

Witnesses 
At about 2 a.m., a neighbor heard the gunfire, grabbed a cell phone, went next door, saw the corpses, and called 911. Wesbrook was arrested at the scene, and it is unknown whether his testimony is accurate or not. There were two witnesses that called 911. The first witness lived upstairs and heard Wesbrook kick open the door and fire off two shots. Knowing exactly what the sound was the neighbor called 911 and while on the line, the dispatcher heard the other three shots ring out.

Victims 
Gloria Jean Coons, 32 (ex-wife)
Antonio Cruz, 35
Anthony Rogers, 41
Diana Money, 43
Kelly Hazlip, 38

Trial and conviction 

Wesbrook's trial only went on for 11 days before a verdict was reached. At his trial, he admitted to killing the victims, but he claimed that he did not intend to kill anyone, and said that he killed the victims in a fit of rage. On August 13, 1998, Wesbrook was sentenced to death by lethal injection.

Despite his low IQ and the disputed testimony of Dr. George Denkowski, Wesbrook was denied another trial in 2007. Wesbrook was executed by lethal injection on March 9, 2016, and was pronounced dead at 8:04 p.m. Before being executed, he said his last words, which were "I'm sorry I can't bring everybody back. I wish things could have been a lot different".

See also 
 Capital punishment in Texas
 List of people executed in Texas, 2010–2019
 List of people executed in the United States in 2016

References

External links 
 Texas Department of Criminal Justice - Inmate Information: Coy Wayne Wesbrook
 Hoffberger, Chase. "Death Watch: Heat of the Moment Coy Wesbrook's mental deficiencies make his pending execution a "travesty," claims his lawyer." Austin Chronicle. March 4, 2016.
 Killer of 5 gets another shot to dodge death Associated Press at the Houston Chronicle. April 4, 2012.
 "Death Row Inmate Interview." Texan News Service (Tarleton State University Department of Journalism). February 18, 2016 - Interview of Wesbrook

Legal documents 
 "Court of Criminal Appeals of Texas,En Banc. Coy Wayne WESBROOK, Appellant, v. The STATE of Texas. No. 73205. Decided: September 20, 2000."
 "United States Court of Appeals,Fifth Circuit. Coy Wayne WESBROOK, Petitioner-Appellant, v. Rick THALER, Director, Texas Department of Criminal Justice, Correctional Institutions Division, Respondent-Appellee. No. 08-70024. Decided: October 13, 2009"
 "Ex parte Coy Wayne Wesbrook (Other)" - Justia - PDF (Archive (Archive)

1958 births
2016 deaths
American mass murderers
Executed mass murderers
American people executed for murder
People convicted of murder by Texas
People executed by Texas by lethal injection
1997 murders in the United States
1997 mass shootings in the United States
People from Houston
21st-century executions by Texas
21st-century executions of American people
Mass shootings in the United States